Haedropleura pygmaea is a species of sea snail, a marine gastropod mollusk in the family Horaiclavidae.

It was previously included within the family Turridae.

Description
The length of the shell attains 5 mm.

The light-brown shell is longitudinally plicate. The plicae are evanescent towards the base of the body whorl.

Distribution
This marine species occurs off Mauritius, Taiwan, Japan and Fiji.

References

 Liu J.Y. [Ruiyu] (ed.). (2008). Checklist of marine biota of China seas. China Science Press. 1267 pp.

External links
 
  Tucker, J.K. 2004 Catalog of recent and fossil turrids (Mollusca: Gastropoda). Zootaxa 682:1–1295.

pygmaea